Barron's or Barrons may refer to:

Barron's Educational Series, a publisher of books, as well as college entrance exam preparation classes and materials, now an imprint of Kaplan Test Prep
B.E.S. Publishing, the former owner of Barron's
Barron's (newspaper), a financial weekly published by US-based Dow Jones & Company
Clarence W. Barron (1855-1928), American financial journalist
Richard Barrons (born 1959), retired British general

See also
Barron (disambiguation)
Baron (disambiguation)